María Guadalupe Silerio Núñez (born 12 December 1971) is a Mexican politician from the Party of the Democratic Revolution. From 2009 to 2010 she served as Deputy of the LXI Legislature of the Mexican Congress representing Durango.

References

1971 births
Living people
Politicians from Durango
Women members of the Chamber of Deputies (Mexico)
Party of the Democratic Revolution politicians
21st-century Mexican politicians
21st-century Mexican women politicians
Deputies of the LXI Legislature of Mexico
Members of the Chamber of Deputies (Mexico) for Durango